The Logistics Civil Augmentation Program (LOGCAP) is a program administered by the US Army to provide contingency support to augment the Army force structure.  The first three contracts (and all task orders under them) were awarded to a single bidder in each round of competition (KBR for the first and third contracts and DynCorp for the second contract).  The fourth and current contract, awarded in June 2007, was split between three companies (KBR, DynCorp, and Fluor Corporation) with each company having the opportunity to compete for task orders.

History
In 1985, LOGCAP was established primarily to plan for contingencies and to leverage the existing civilian resources.  However, it was not until three years later before it was first used.  In support of a United States Third Army mission, the United States Army Corps of Engineers (USACE) used LOGCAP to contract for the construction and maintenance of two petroleum pipelines systems in Southwest Asia.

The current task order contract concept of LOGCAP began in August 1992 when USACE awarded the first contract (LOGCAP I) to Brown and Root Services (now KBR) in August 1992 as a cost-plus-award-fee contract, which was used in December that year to support the United Nations forces in Somalia.  This contract was also used to support forces in Bosnia, Kosovo, Macedonia, Hungary, Saudi Arabia, Haiti, Italy and Rwanda.

The LOGCAP contract was recompeted in late 1996, with Army Materiel Command (AMC) taking over management of the program from USACE (although USACE has retained the support requirements for the Balkans Peninsula continuously since that date).  The second contract (LOGCAP II) was awarded to DynCorp in January 1997.  From 1997 to 2001, DynCorp supported US forces in the Philippines, Guatemala, Colombia, Ecuador, East Timor, and Panama.

AMC awarded LOGCAP III, the third contract, to KBR in 2001.  LOGCAP III primarily supported the Global War on Terrorism in Iraq, Afghanistan, Kuwait, Djibouti, and Georgia.

However, as a result of the criticisms leveled against KBR for contract performance, AMC wanted to end the LOGCAP III contract in 2007, but continued it for contracts in Iraq until withdrawal of United States military forces was completed.  The current contract (LOGCAP IV) differed greatly from its three predecessors, in that multiple contracts were awarded (to KBR, DynCorp, and Fluor), whereupon the three could compete for future task orders.

Sister service organizations

The corresponding service organizations for the U.S. Air Force is the Air Force Contract Augmentation Program (AFCAP), and the U.S. Navy has the Navy Global Contingency Construction Contract (GCCC) and the Global Contingency Services Contract (GCSC).

References

See also

United States Department of Defense agencies